In planetary nomenclature, a tholus  (pl. tholi ) is a small domical mountain or hill. The word is from the Greek θόλος, tholos (pl. tholoi), which means a circular building with a conical or vaulted roof. The Romans transliterated the word into the Latin tholus, which means cupola or dome. In 1973, the International Astronomical Union (IAU) adopted tholus as one of a number of official descriptor terms for topographic features on Mars and other planets and satellites. One justification for using neutral Latin or Greek descriptors was that it allowed features to be named and described before their geology or geomorphology could be determined. For example, many tholi appear to be volcanic in origin, but the term does not imply a specific geologic origin. Currently (March 2015), the IAU recognizes 56 descriptor terms. (See Planetary nomenclature.) Tholi are present on Venus, Mars, asteroid 4 Vesta, dwarf planet Ceres, and on Jupiter's moon Io.

Examples of tholi
 Hecates Tholus
 Tharsis Tholus

References

External links
 Lists of named tholi: on Venus, on Mars, on Vesta, on Io

 

Geology of Mars
Volcanoes of Mars